Honnasandra is a village in Bangalore Urban district.

Villages in Bangalore Urban district